KASI (1430 AM, "News Talk 1430") is a radio station licensed to serve Ames, Iowa. The station is owned by iHeartMedia, Inc. and licensed to iHM Licenses, LLC. It airs a news/talk radio format.

The station was assigned the KASI call letters by the Federal Communications Commission.

The transmitter and tower are located in northwest Ames.

In January 2016 KASI applied for an FM translator to rebroadcast the AM signal at 94.1 MHz. That application has since been approved to KASI by the FCC as of February 2016.

References

External links
KASI official website

FCC History Cards for KASI

ASI
News and talk radio stations in the United States
Ames, Iowa
Radio stations established in 1974
1974 establishments in Iowa
IHeartMedia radio stations